Mix Tape: The Art of Cassette Culture is a 2005 book edited by musician Thurston Moore on Universe Publishing.

Info

The book is a collection of stories, essays, art, and other contributions by various artists, musicians, and writers. It centers around the role of the mixtape and cassette culture in the lives of the contributors, which stands as a testimony to the importance of the medium starting in the late 1970s to its relevance today. Here tapes are used mostly to confess love or admiration, or to expose an acquaintance to new and underground music.

Quotes

"The mix tape is a form of American folk art: predigested cultural artifacts combined with homespun technology and magic marker turn the mix tape into a message in a bottle. I am no mere consumer of pop culture, it says, but also a producer of it. Mix tapes mark the moment of consumer culture in which listeners attained control over what they heard, in what order and at what cost." Matias Viegener

"I have so many Mix Tape stories it's hard to know where to begin."  Allison Anders

"The mix tape is a list a quotations, a poetic form in fact: the cento is a poem made up of lines pulled from other poems.  The new poet collects and remixes.  Similarly an operation of taste, it is also cousin to the curious passion of the obsessive collector.  Unable to express himself in 'pure' art, the collector finds himself in obsessive acquisition. Collecting is strangely hot and cold, passionate and calculating."  Matias Viegener

Contributors

Lasse Marhaug,
Pat Griffin,
Ahmet Zappa,
Karen Constance aka Karen Lollypop,
Mike Watt,
Glen E. Friedman,
Cynthia Connolly,
Galaxie 500,
Tom Greenwood of Jackie-O Motherfucker,
David Choe,
Matias Viegener,
Lili Dwight,
Mac McCaughan,
Dodie Bellamy,
Dan Graham,
William Winant,
Jim O'Rourke,
Leah Singer,
Ryan McGinness,
Jutta Koether,
Richard Kern,
Rita Ackermann,
Robert Bellinger,
John Miller,
Trisha Donnelly,
Georganne Deen,
Sue de Beer,
Sharon Cheslow,
Slim Moon,
Allison Anders,
Mary Gaitskill,
Spencer Sweeney,
Elizabeth Peyton,
Genevieve Dellinger,
Loren Mazzacane Connors,
Camden Joy,
Bret McCabe,
Christian Schumann,
DJ Spooky,
Jade Gordon,
Daniella Meeker,
John Sinclair,
Kate Spade,
Andy Spade,
Tony Conrad,
Christopher Knowles,
Christian Marclay,
Tom Sachs

2005 non-fiction books
Music books
Cassette culture 1970s–1990s